Barrio Sur may refer to:

Barrio Sur, Montevideo
Barrio Sur, Panama